Motasem Al Bustami born 6 June 1999) is a Qatari born-Jordanian footballer who plays as a goalkeeper for Qatar Stars League  side Qatar.

References

External links
 

1999 births
Living people
Qatari footballers
Qatari people of Jordanian descent
Naturalised citizens of Qatar
Association football goalkeepers
Qatar Stars League players
El Jaish SC players
Qatar SC players